Bidu (also Romanized as Bīdū; also known as Bidu Mūrdī, Bāgh-e Bīdū, Bāgh-e Dīdū, and Bāgh-i-Bīdu) is a village in Anarestan Rural District, Riz District, Jam County, Bushehr Province, Iran. At the 2006 census, its population was 45, in 7 families.

References 

Populated places in Jam County